Krushari Municipality is a municipality (obshtina) in Dobrich Province, Northeastern Bulgaria, located in Southern Dobruja geographical region, bounded by Romania to the north. It is named after its administrative centre - the village of Krushari.

Settlements 

Krushari Municipality includes the following 19 places, all of them are villages:

Demography 
The following table shows the change of the population during the last four decades.

Religion 
According to the latest Bulgarian census of 2011, the religious composition, among those who answered the optional question on religious identification, was the following:

See also
 Provinces of Bulgaria
 Municipalities of Bulgaria
 List of cities and towns in Bulgaria

References

External links
 Krushari municipality website 

Municipalities in Dobrich Province